Lazzaro is the third album by the Japanese rock band D'erlanger, released on March 14, 2007. Their first release in 17 years, it reached number 32 on the Oricon chart.

An English version of "Dummy Blue" appeared on D'erlanger's 2010 self-cover album A Fabulous Thing in Rose. For 2017's D'erlanger Tribute Album ~Stairway to Heaven~, "Dummy Blue" was covered by Angelo and "XXX for You" by lynch.

Track listing
 "Kain"
 "Dummy Blue"
 "XXX for You"
 "Baby I Want You"
 "Divina Commedia"
 "Beauty & Beast"
 "Romeo & Juliet"
 "Alone"
 
 "Maria"
 "Noir - C'est la vie"
 "Noir - D'amour"
 "Abel"

References

2007 albums
D'erlanger albums